Mesovelia vittigera is a species of water treader in the genus Mesovelia, first described by Géza Horváth in  1895.

References 

Mesoveliidae